This is a list of countries by silicon production in 2021 based on USGS figures.

References

Lists of countries by mineral production
Silicon